Listeria floridensis is a species of bacteria. It is a Gram-positive, facultatively anaerobic, non-motile, non-spore-forming bacillus. It is non-pathongenic and non-hemolytic. The species was discovered in and named after Florida, and its discovery was first published in 2014.

Listeria floridensis is the only non-motile member of genus Listeria that is unable to reduce nitrate.

References

External links
Type strain of Listeria floridensis at BacDive -  the Bacterial Diversity Metadatabase

floridensis
Bacteria described in 2014